Oliver Henry may refer to:

 Oliver Henry, a pen name, along with O. Henry, of American author William Sydney Porter (1862–1910)
 Oliver Henry (USCG) (1921–1987), African-American United States Coast Guard sailor, the first black sailor to transfer from the Mess Steward occupational class
Oliver Henry (footballer) (born 2002), Australian rules football player
 , a Sentinel-class cutter

See also
Henry Oliver (disambiguation)